The Lancair IV and IV-P are a family of four-seat, low-wing, retractable-gear, composite monoplanes powered by a 550 cubic inch Continental TSIO-550 twin-turbocharged piston engine.

Production of the aircraft kit was ended in 2012.

Development

The Lancair IV and IV-P were designed by Lancair around the Continental TSIO-550 — a twin turbocharged engine that is capable of developing  at sea level, and capable of operating at altitudes as high as 29,000 feet.

By the fall of 2011, 110 Lancair IVs and 250 IV-Ps had been completed and were flying.

In July 2016, the company announced it would sell the older Lancair lines of aircraft, including the Lancair IV, to concentrate on the Lancair Evolution instead. Once the transition was complete, the company changed its name to the Evolution Aircraft Company. The buyer of the old lines of aircraft continued in business as Lancair International, LLC.

Operational history
In 2014, Bill Harrelson piloted a Lancair IV, and set a world speed record for solo flight between the earth's poles for an aircraft under  in a 175-hour-long series of flights. The flight also broke a record from Fairbanks, Alaska to Kinston, North Carolina. The aircraft was modified to hold  of fuel.

Variants
Lancair IV
Unpressurized four seat kit-plane, powered by a  Continental TSIO-550 engine
Lancair IV-P
Pressurized four seat kit-plane, powered by a  Continental TSIO-550 engine
Lancair Propjet
Pressurized four seat kit-plane, powered by either a Walter or a PT6 Pratt & Whitney turboprop, that can achieve cruise speeds in excess of 300 knots (556 km/h) at altitudes up to 30,000 feet (9,140 m).
Lancair Tigress
The engine was later cancelled, and consequently, only prototypes of the aircraft were completed.
RDD Enterprises LX7
A re-manufactured version that converted an existing IV-P by replacing the wing with one with a new airfoil to reduce stall speed, a new fuel system, new interior, and avionics.

Accidents
As of June 2014, the NTSB Aviation Accident Database recorded 20 crashes involving 18 fatalities across all IV variants.

On February 3, 2012, Steve Appleton, CEO of Micron Technology, Inc., was killed while attempting an emergency landing in a Lancair IV-PT turboprop at the Boise Airport in Boise, Idaho, moments after takeoff. He had aborted a take off a few minutes earlier.

Specifications (Lancair IV-P)

References

External links

 Official website

Homebuilt aircraft
1990s United States civil utility aircraft
IV
Single-engined tractor aircraft
Low-wing aircraft